KCKF may refer to:

 KCKF (FM), a radio station (91.9 FM) licensed to serve Cuba, Missouri, United States
 Crisp County–Cordele Airport (ICAO code KCKF)